Edward Collier may refer to:
Evert Collier (1642–1708), Dutch painter
Edward Collier (pirate), English buccaneer